Neopomacentrus azysron is a damselfish from the Indo-West Pacific. It occasionally makes its way into the aquarium trade. It grows to a size of 7.5 cm in length.

References

External links
 

azysron
Fish described in 1877